Nada Kolundžija (born 30 June 1952) is a politician in Serbia. She has served several terms in the National Assembly of Serbia, initially with the Democratic Alternative (Demokratska alternativa, DA) and later with the Democratic Party (Demokratska stranka, DS). She also served in the Assembly of Serbia and Montenegro from 2003 to 2004. Kolundžija was expelled from the DS in 2020 against the backdrop of a larger purge of the party's membership.

She is not to be confused with a concert pianist of the same name.

Early life and career
Kolundžija was born in Subotica, Autonomous Province of Vojvodina, in what was then the People's Republic of Serbia in the Federal People's Republic of Yugoslavia. She graduated from the University of Belgrade's Faculty of Political Sciences and was the secretary of Belgrade's Matica iseljenika centre from 1989 to 1998. She also worked in public relations and was an editor for the newspaper Blic.

Politician
Kolundžija participated in the 1996–1997 protests in Serbia and was a founding member of the DA in July 1997. She was later chosen as a party vice-president.

The Democratic Alternative participated in the 2000 Yugoslavian parliamentary election as part of the Democratic Opposition of Serbia (Demokratska opozicija Srbije, DOS), a broad and ideologically diverse coalition of parties opposed to Slobodan Milošević's continued rule. Kolundžija appeared in the fourth and final position on the DOS's electoral list for the Belgrade division of Palilula. The DOS won three seats in the division and she did not receive a mandate for the federal parliament. Milošević was defeated in the concurrent Yugoslavian presidential election, a watershed event that precipitated broad changes in Serbian and Yugoslavian politics. Kolundžija was appointed to the Radio Television of Serbia board of directors in the aftermath of Milošević's fall from power.

A new parliamentary election was held in Serbia in December 2000, three months after the Yugoslavian vote. Kolundžija was given the sixtieth position on the DOS's list, which won a landslide victory with 176 out of 250 mandates, and she was included in her party's delegation when the assembly met in January 2001. (From 2000 to 2011, all parliamentary mandates were awarded to sponsoring parties or coalitions rather than to individual candidates, and it was common practice for the mandates to be distributed out of numerical order. Kolundžija did not automatically receive a mandate by virtue of her list position, but she was chosen as a Democratic Alternative representative all the same.) She served as a supporter of Serbia's government for the next four years and was president of the assembly's foreign affairs committee.

The Federal Republic of Yugoslavia was restructured as the State Union of Serbia and Montenegro in 2003. A new unicameral parliament was established for the entity, and its first members were chosen by indirect election from the republican parliaments of Serbia and Montenegro. The Democratic Alternative had the right to appoint two members; its choices were party leader Nebojša Čović and Kolundžija.

The DA contested the 2003 Serbian parliamentary election on its own, and Kolundžija appeared on its list in the eighty-ninth position. The list did not cross the electoral threshold to win representation in the new assembly, and Kolundžija's terms in the federal and republican parliaments ended in early 2004. She left the DA after a falling out with Čović and joined the Democratic Centre (Demokratski centar, DC), which in turn merged into the DS.

Kolundžija appeared in the fifty-eighth position on the DS's list for the City Assembly of Belgrade in the 2004 Serbian local elections. The list won a plurality victory with thirty-four seats, and she did not take a seat in the assembly.

She appeared on the DS's list in the 2007 parliamentary election and was given a new mandate when the list won sixty-four seats. After the election, the DS formed an unstable coalition government with the rival Democratic Party of Serbia (Demokratska stranka Srbije, DSS) and other parties. Kolundžija was chosen as the leader of the DS's parliamentary group. She criticized the DSS's harsh rhetoric against the North Atlantic Treaty Organization (NATO), arguing that this was detrimental to Serbia's interests during international discussions on the status of Kosovo. Kolundžija was profiled by the news agency Beta in late 2007, with the report describing her as "an extremely capable and determined politician."

The DS–DSS coalition fell apart in early 2008, and a new parliamentary election was held in May of that year. The DS contested the election at the head of the For a European Serbia coalition, and Kolundžija appeared in the eighty-eighth position on its list. She received a mandate for a third term when the list won a plurality victory with 102 seats. Although the results of the election were initially inconclusive, For a European Serbia eventually formed a new coalition government with the Socialist Party of Serbia (Socijalistička partija Srbije, SPS). Kolundžija served as leader of the For a European Serbia group in the assembly and supported the choice of Mirko Cvetković as prime minister. She was also a member of Serbia's delegation to the Inter-Parliamentary Union during this time.

In 2010, she played a prominent role in ensuring the Serbian assembly's approval of a declaration condemning the 1995 Srebrenica massacre. Later in the same year, she described Serbian president Boris Tadić's diplomatic visit to Vukovar as an important step in improving relations between Serbia and Croatia.

Serbia's electoral system was reformed in 2011, such that parliamentary mandates were awarded in numerical order to candidates on successful lists. Kolundžija received the twelfth position on the DS's Choice for a Better Life list in the 2012 parliamentary election and was re-elected when the list won sixty-seven mandates. The Serbian Progressive Party (Srpska napredna stranka, SNS) won a narrow plurality victory in the election and formed a new administration with the SPS. The DS moved to opposition and, over the next two years, became increasingly divided into rival factions.

Kolundžija received the twenty-fourth position on the DS's list in the 2014 parliamentary election. Weakened by divisions, the party's list won only nineteen mandates, and she was not re-elected. She received the thirtieth position in the 2016 election and was again not returned when the list won only sixteen mandates.

She received the lead position on the DS's list for the New Belgrade municipal assembly in the 2016 Serbian local elections, which were held concurrently with the parliamentary vote, and was elected when the list won three mandates. She resigned her local mandate on 20 July 2016.

Kolundžija was elected a DS vice-president in September 2016. She was later one of several prominent figures expelled from the party in September 2020. In February 2021, she joined the newly formed Democrats of Serbia (Demokrate Srbije).

References

1952 births
Living people
People from Subotica
Politicians from Belgrade
21st-century Serbian women politicians
21st-century Serbian politicians
Members of the National Assembly (Serbia)
Members of the Assembly of Serbia and Montenegro
Delegates to the Inter-Parliamentary Union Assembly
Democratic Alternative (Serbia) politicians
Democratic Centre (Serbia) politicians
Democratic Party (Serbia) politicians
Women members of the National Assembly (Serbia)